Héctor Marcano (born November 3, 1956) is a Puerto Rican producer, host, actor, and comedian. Marcano is also an owner of low-power television station WWXY-LD Channel 38.

Hector Marcano currently serves as Vice President of Hispanic Operations East, for iHeartMedia. Marcano works with iHeartMedia's Hispanic radio stations, with a special focus in the Miami, Chicago, Orlando, and Atlanta markets.

Early years
Héctor Marcano was born in Ponce, Puerto Rico.

Career
Marcano's career took off after Luis Vigoreaux's death. He started hosting A Millón, a Puerto Rican game show, along with Sonia Noemí and Rafael José. The show was rated the number one television game show for several years.

In 1987, alongside El Gangster Marcano performed as host of Super Siete's  La Hora de Oro. In the same year, Marcano had a highly publicized wedding to Ivette Rivera-Lisojo. The wedding was shown live on Puerto Rican television. Vea, a local show biz magazine, produced a wedding album about the event.

In 1990, Marcano moved to Telemundo to start a new show Marcano... el show. The show was both popular and controversial, being accused of being a copycat of The Arsenio Hall Show.

In 1996, Marcano moved to WAPA-TV and produced a new game show called Vale Más, and in 1998, another show called El Super Show.

In 2000, he moved to Tele-Once but continued with El Super Show for a while.  Later in 2000 Marcano created Que Suerte que es Domingo.  This show underwent two title changes: Que Suerte Tienes Tú, and in 2002, Que Suerte, his longest running show, and top in the ratings consequently, broadcast by Univision. It was broadcast in Puerto Rico and in the Miami, New York and Philadelphia metropolitan areas via their respective Univision affiliates. In 2011, the show moved to Telemundo and was renamed Factor Suerte.

In 2016, Marcano was appointed to the Board of Directors of Viva Entertainment Group, Inc.

On May 25, 2020, Marcano returns to the Puerto Rican television airwaves, hosting the new talk show, titled MegaNoche which will broadcast from his home in Orlando and will be air live from Puerto Rico on Mega TV-owned station WTCV at 7:00 pm on weekdays.

See also

 Avelino Muñoz Stevenson
 List of television presenters/Puerto Rico
 List of Puerto Ricans

References

Living people
Puerto Rican television personalities
Puerto Rican comedians
American television talk show hosts
Male actors from Ponce, Puerto Rico
1956 births
Puerto Rican television producers
Puerto Rican television hosts